Barua is a census town in the Beldanga I CD block in the Berhampore subdivision of the Murshidabad district in the state of West Bengal, India.

Geography

Location                                

Area overview
The area shown in the map alongside, covering Berhampore and Kandi subdivisions, is spread across both the natural physiographic regions of the district, Rarh and Bagri.The headquarters of Murshidabad district, Berhampore, is in this area. The entire area is overwhelmingly rural with over 80% of the population living in the rural areas.

Note: The map alongside presents some of the notable locations in the subdivisions. All places marked in the map are linked in the larger full screen map.

Demographics
According to the 2011 Census of India, Barua (P) had a total population of 8,852, of which 4,521 (51%) were males and 4,331 (49%) were females. Population in the age range 0-6 years was 1,431. The total number of literate persons in Barua (P) was 5,589 (75.31% of the population 6 years).

Infrastructure
According to the District Census Handbook, Murshidabad,  2011, Barua (P) covered an area of 4.252 km2The protected water-supply involved tap water from treated source etc. It had 400 domestic electric connections, 40 road lighting points. Among the medical facilities it had 1 hospital, 1 dispensary/ health centre, 1 family welfare centre, 1 maternity & child welfare centre, 1 veterinary hospital, 10 medicine shops. Among the educational facilities, it had 1 primary school, 1 secondary school, 1 senior secondary school, general degree college at Beldanga 1 km away. It had 5 non-formal education centres (Sarva Shiksha Abhiyan). It produced wooden furniture, sweets. It had the branch offices of 1 nationalised bank, 1 private commercial bank.

Healthcare 
Beldanga I CD block is one of the areas of Murshidabad district where ground water is affected by high level of arsenic contamination. The WHO guideline for arsenic in drinking water is 10 mg/ litre, and the Indian Standard value is 50 mg/ litre. The maximum concentration in Beldanga I CD block is 1,700 mg/litre.

References

Cities and towns in Murshidabad district